"Lend Me Your Comb" is a 1957 song written by Kay Twomey, Fred Wise and Ben Weisman. The song was first released by female singer Carol Hughes as the A-Side of her Roulette Records single R-4041, which was reviewed by Billboard magazine in their December 30, 1957 issue. Male singer Bernie Knee issued a version of the song as the A-side of his Columbia Records single 4–41090, which the website 45cat.com claims was issued December 23, 1957.

Carl Perkins and his brother Jay performed the song for the B-Side of "Glad All Over", which was released by Sun Records on the "Sun 287: The Rockin' Guitar Man" record.

The song also appears in the 1983 film The Outsiders.

The Beatles version
English rock band The Beatles recorded a version of the song for the BBC which was later released on the Anthology 1 album  and subsequently on On Air – Live at the BBC Volume 2.

The Hoodoo Gurus version
Australian rock band The Hoodoo Gurus recorded a live version of the song which was released on the Bite the Bullet album.

See also
Carl Perkins
1957 in music
1963 in music
Rockabilly
Rock'n'Roll

References

Sources

Perkins, Carl, and David McGee. Go, Cat, Go!: The Life and Times of Carl Perkins, The King of Rockabilly. Hyperion Press, 1996. 
Morrison, Craig. Go Cat Go!: Rockabilly Music and Its Makers. University of Illinois Press, 1998.

The Beatles songs
Hoodoo Gurus songs
Carl Perkins songs
1956 songs
Songs with music by Ben Weisman
Songs with lyrics by Kay Twomey
Songs with lyrics by Fred Wise (songwriter)